Charivari (pronounced ) is a piece of traditional Bavarian costume jewellery made of solid silver or of rare silver-plated chain, adorned with trinkets, gemstone, coins (or possibly medals), horn discs, carved deer teeth, antlers, animal paws, badger hair, or other game teeth.

Origin and use
The name charivari (from the Latin caribaria meaning "mess" or "madness") came into the German-speaking world during the Napoleonic era. At that time it had a secondary, more important, meaning of "pandemonium" or "commotion". This meaning has continued in both English and French until the present day.

Bavarian men wear the charivari on the belt of their lederhosen. The charivari traditionally served as jewellery or as a talisman for a successful hunt. For farmers it served as a valuable status symbol. The charivari probably originated from a watch chain, which was attached to the buttonhole of the costume shirt and hung from time to time with various hunting trophies. It could not be bought, was carefully preserved and was passed down in a single family through the generations.

Some ancient charivaris can have a value of up to 10,000 euros (about £8,770). They are spread throughout the Eastern Alps and have become fashionable throughout Bavaria once more, being revived by the increasing popularity of local traditional costume clubs. The chain for women is usually much finer, usually made of so-called rose-plated "Erbsketten" and can also be adorned with small solid silver talismen with small pieces of antler or coins. Some unusual charivaris may be made from very expensive composite antlers or fox teeth. In modern charivaris the animal materials are usually replaced with cast metal trinkets.

Gallery

See also
 Charm bracelet

References

Types of jewellery
Culture of Altbayern